Eun-seo, also spelled Eun-suh, or Eun-so, Un-seo, is a Korean feminine given name. The meaning differs based on the hanja used to write each syllable of the name. There are 30 hanja with the reading "eun" and 53 hanja with the reading  "seo" on the South Korean government's official list of hanja which may be used in given names. Eun-seo was the 10th-most popular name for baby girls born in South Korea in 2011, 2013.

People
Son Eun-seo (born 1986), South Korean actress

Fictional
Choi Eun-suh, in 2000 South Korean television series Autumn in My Heart
Park Un-seo, in 1999 South Korean film The Ring Virus
Oh Eunseo, in a 2016 - 2019 South Korean Comic Killing Stalking

See also
List of Korean given names

References

Korean feminine given names